Wildflower was a 2017 Philippine revenge drama television series starring Maja Salvador, together with an ensemble cast. The show originally aired on ABS-CBN, and worldwide on The Filipino Channel, on network's Primetime Bida evening block from February 13, 2017, to February 9, 2018, replacing Pinoy Big Brother: Lucky Season 7: Mga Kwento ng Dream Team ni Kuya and was replaced by The Blood Sisters.

Series overview 
 

The story revolves around Lily Cruz who (along with her family) falls victim to the ruthless Ardiente family. Emilia Torillo, the matriarch of the Ardiente family, orders an assassin to murder Camia Cruz and Dante Cruz, Lily's parents. Unbeknownst to Emilia, Lily survives the massacre and is adopted by Prianka Aguas, a billionaire businesswoman. Lily changes her identity to become Ivy Aguas, a strong-willed woman. She returns to Poblacion Ardiente as Ivy to avenge her parents and everyone else who were victimized by the evil Ardiente family.

Season 1 (2017) 
 
The story follows Lily Cruz, a beautiful heiress who wants justice for her father Dante's death and mother Camia's assault and resulting insanity, by seeking revenge against the evil Ardiente family, a powerful political dynasty in the fictional province that bears their name. The Ardiente family is the most powerful political force in the province under the jurisdiction of the governor, Julio Ardiente, and his daughter, Emilia, the mayor of the municipality (Poblacion Ardiente). Emilia's philanderous husband Raul assaults Camia prompting Dante to file rape charges against him. Lily's world crumbles when Dante suspiciously dies from a heart attack and she witnesses her mother's rape. Though targeted to be killed herself, the assassins feel pity for the 9-year old and frees her instead.

Prianka Aguas legally adopts Lily and raises her to become tough, providing her with the resources to seek justice for her parents. With a billion dollar conglomerate behind her, Ivy is a magnet for the Ardientes who are preparing their campaign for the gubernatorial and congressional elections.

Season 2 (2017) 
 
Ivy seduces the Ardientes' weakest link, Arnaldo. He becomes obsessed with her and drives him near crazy. After several retaliatory attempts by Emilia against Ivy fails, Emilia is committed to a psychiatric facility. Ivy then instigates the removal of Julio Ardiente from office, weakens his hold on the province and then robs him of the only person he loves, his grandson, Arnaldo. However, throughout the sequence of events, the Ardientes have determined that Ivy is an adversary. Thus, they have her disposed of, by being buried alive in a wooden-coffin. She miraculously escapes death and returns with a vengeance.

Season 3 (2017) 

In a carefully orchestrated hijacking, Ivy gatecrashes a celebration being held by the Ardientes and reveals her real identity as Lily Cruz, to the shock of the Ardientes who supervised her "burial" in the cemetery. Through a series of activities, she cripples Ardientes' powerful influence but a new hidden enemy suddenly surfaces. It is later on revealed that this is Helena Montoya, the real mother of Emilia Ardiente. Also, known in the criminal world as "Red Dragon", she controls the country's largest crime syndicate.  Notwithstanding the sinister résumé, Helena is no match to Lily's superior skills, and after several conflicts, Lily brings Red Dragon's operations to a halt.

Season 4 (2017–18) 

Diego and Lily get married and go off on their honeymoon. Arnaldo interrupts their celebration and commits suicide in front of them after being angrily rejected by Lily. In the mental asylum, Emilia is haunted by the evil ghosts of Helena and Arnaldo who exhort her to kill Diego and Lily to avenge their deaths. She unexpectedly regains her sanity, is released and obtains the support of the Asian syndicate using the password her mother gives her before she dies. Lily undermines Emilia’s ascent into power when she notifies the syndicate leader that Julio Ardiente had ordered the "Red Dragon"’s murder. Meanwhile, Lily discovers valuable information about a mass grave the Ardientes begin to use in the mid-50s when the family first seized power. Lily orchestrates a leak, instructing Jepoy and Ana to contact local media about the mass grave and stir up the citizens of Poblacion Ardiente to do the same. The media frenzy covering the atrocities committed by the Ardientes embolden whistleblowers and other victims to speak up, including former accomplices and political supporters like Natalie, ex-bodyguards, former assassins, and Judge Lustre.

A popular uprising topples the Ardiente family. With solid evidence and witnesses no longer afraid to speak out, the people of Ardiente file cases of multiple murders, frustrated homicides, Estafa, plunder charges that would send them to prison for a long time, but Julio and Emilia escape capture. Their joy does not last long when Julio assassinates Diego with a sniper rifle, escaping once again to a Triad safe house.

Emilia realizes her father's direct hand in the murders of her Aunt Claire and mother Helena; and that he never respected her as an equal. As Lily tries to stop Julio from escaping, Emilia comes face-to-face with her father, who shoots him several times and in turn, shoots Emilia in the spine. Later, Emilia, now a paraplegic is serving her time in prison. Lily visits extending an Olive branch and forgives her. The story ends with an epilogue showing Venus (Helena Montoya’s adopted daughter) torturing Julio to death with a blowtorch.

Cast and characters

Protagonist
 Maja Salvador as Ivy P. Aguas / Lily Cruz-Torillo

Main
 Aiko Melendez as Governor Emilia Ardiente-Torillo
 Tirso Cruz III as Julio Ardiente
 Joseph Marco as Diego Torillo 
 RK Bagatsing as Mayor Arnaldo Ardiente Torillo 
 Vin Abrenica as Jepoy Madrigal
 Wendell Ramos as Raul Torillo / Fake Jaguar
 Sunshine Cruz as Camia Delos Santos-Cruz / Jasmine (season 1) 
 Roxanne Barcelo as Natalie Alcantara (seasons 1–3, supporting; season 4, main)
 Yen Santos as Rosana "Ana" Navarro-Madrigal (seasons 2–3, supporting; season 4, main) / Fake Lily Cruz (seasons 2–3, supporting)
 Christian Vasquez as Atty. Dante Cruz (seasons 1, 4, special guest) / Damian Cruz (season 3, supporting; season 4, main) / Real Jaguar (season 3, supporting; season 4, main) 
 Miko Raval as Marlon Cabrera (seasons 2–3, supporting; season 4, main)
 Zsa Zsa Padilla as Helena Montoya (season 3, special guest; season 4, main) / Red Dragon (season 3, special guest; season 4, main)

Supporting
 Malou de Guzman as Lorena "Loring" Cervantes (seasons 1–3)
 Bodjie Pascua as Leopando "Pandoy" Cervantes (seasons 1–3)
 Isay Alvarez-Seña as Clarita "Claire" De Guzman (seasons 1–3)
 Ana Abad Santos as Carlotta Navarro (seasons 1–2, supporting; season 4, special guest) 
 Chinggoy Alonzo as Pablo Alcantara (season 1)
 Jett Pangan as William Alvarez (season 1)
 Arnold Reyes as Arthur Vergara
 Shiela Valderrama as Atty. Georgina Fisher
 Richard Quan as Col. Jose Sanggano (season 3)
 Bobby Andrews as Mateo Ruiz (seasons 3–4)
 Alma Concepcion as Divine Oytengco (season 3)
 Maika Rivera as Stefanie Oytengco (season 3)
 Mark Rafael Bringas as John Gonzalez (season 3)
 Biboy Ramirez as Jude Asuncion (season 3)
 Nina Ricci Alagao as Mercedes Palacio (season 3)
 Jun Urbano as Ramon Lim (North) (season 3)
 Bernard Laxa as Silverio Victoria (East) (season 3)
 Bong Regala as Carlos Isidro (West) (season 3)
 Matthew Mendoza as Oscar Evangelista (South) (season 3)
 Dawn Chang as Maila Lomeda / Ms. Moran (seasons 3–4)
 Jeffrey Santos as Col. Magbanua (seasons 3–4)
 Jong Cuenco as Judge Manuel Lustre (seasons 3–4)
 Michael Flores as Agent Noel Salonga (seasons 3–4)

Recurring
 Raul Montessa as Fernan Naig 
 Vivo Ouano as Raul's ally (seasons 2–4)
 June Macasaet as Raul's ally (seasons 2–4)
 Prince De Guzman as Raul's ally (seasons 2–4)
 Angelo Ilagan as Raul's ally (seasons 2–4)
 Menggie Cobarubias as Atty. Sebastian (season 3)
 Justin Cuyugan as Mr. Paterno (seasons 3–4)
 Alex Castro as Rufo Cruz (season 3)
 Carlos Morales as Romulo
 Zeus Collins as Damian's ally (seasons 3–4)
 Luis Hontiveros as Damian's ally (seasons 3–4)
 Lito Pimentel as Cong. Ruel Cansiao (season 3)
 Richard Lopez (season 3)
 Alvin Nakassi (season 3)
 Vanessa Wright (season 3)
 Kris Janson (season 3)
 Epi Quizon as Stefano dela Torre (season 4)
 Jojo Riguerra (season 1–4)

Guest cast
 Johnny Revilla (season 1)
 Precious Lara Quigaman as Rosario (season 1)
 Carla Martinez as Hon. Alice Rivera (season 1)
 Uncredited as Maria (season 1)
 Rodolfo Madrigal Jr. as Portunato "Pot" David (season 2)
 Anthony Taberna as himself (season 2)
 Dolores Bunoan as Belen (season 2)
 Rolly Innocencio as Witness (season 2)
 Juan Rodrigo as Ramon Montoya (season 3)
 Victor Silayan as Enrique (season 3)
 Christopher Roxas as Apollo (season 3)
 Matrica Mae Centino as Montona (season 3)
 Allan Paule as Ben (season 4)
 Gio Alvarez as Ronald (season 4)
 Tess Antonio as Edna (season 4)
 Gerald Pizarrras as Efren (season 4)

Special guest stars
 Priscilla Meirelles as Prianka Patil-Aguas (season 1)
 Pinky Amador as Esmeralda De Guzman-Ardiente (season 1)
 Xyriel Manabat as Young Lily /Ivy P. Aguas (season 1)
 Ejay Falcon (season 1) and Patrick Garcia (season 3) as Young Julio Ardiente (seasons 1, 3)
 Jesse James Ongteco as Young Diego Torillo (season 1)
 Izzy Canillo as Young Arnaldo Ardiente Torillo (season 1)
 Azi Villanueva as Young Jepoy Madrigal (season 1)
 Kyline Alcantara and Jennica Garcia as Young Emilia Ardiente (season 2)
 Joseph Andre Garcia as Young Raul Torillo (season 2)
 Mutya Orquia as Young Rosana "Ana" Navarro (season 2)
 Ellen Adarna as Young Esmeralda De Guzman-Ardiente (season 2)
 Emmanuelle Vera as Young Helena Montoya (season 2) / Red Dragon (season 3)
 Karylle as Venus (season 4)

Production

Filming
Filming for Wildflower began on December 5, 2016.

Casting
Danita Paner was the first choice to play the role of Natalie. However, she refused because the role would require cutting her hair short. The role eventually went to Roxanne Barcelo.

Broadcast
Wildflower aired on ABS-CBN's Primetime Bida evening block at 5:45 PM PST, before TV Patrol and worldwide via TFC.

Timeslot
Wildflower was originally planned to replace the long running drama Doble Kara as part of Kapamilya Gold afternoon block. However, due to the longing request of the fans, the management eventually decided to air the series in the evening block. Two days before the premiere, the timeslot was announced on February 10, 2017.

Reruns
The first 30 episodes of Wildflower were once made available to watch on YouTube, however at an unknown date, presumably within 2021, they have been made private along with the show's highlights.

Reruns of the show's episodes airs on Jeepney TV.

On March 18, 2020, ABS-CBN announced that Wildflower will also rerun its episodes beginning March 23, 2020, via the network's Primetime Bida evening block, replacing A Soldier's Heart, as part of ABS-CBN's temporary programming changes due to the community quarantine done to reduce the spread of the COVID-19 pandemic This rerun was abruptly cut due to the temporary closure of ABS-CBN following the cease and desist order issued by the National Telecommunications Commission on account of its franchise expiration. As of June 15, 2020, Wildflower, no longer a replacement of A Soldier's Heart, the show returned on June 15, 2020. Wildflower is currently airing episodes in a different airtime.

The show became available on Netflix on September 9, 2022, in a condensed format consisting of 2 seasons and 133 episodes.

Extension
ABS-CBN has announced that Wildflower will be extended until February 9, 2018. The series was said to be extended until March 2018 for Book 4 as announced by Vice Ganda in her late night show Gandang Gabi Vice, but it was pulled out to give way for The Blood Sisters.

Reception

Wildflower became a very controversial series during its run, with its unconventional depiction of Philippine politics, political dynasties, nepotism, political violence, organized crime, schizophrenia and human rights violations, as well as its allusion of events in modern Philippine history on primetime programming, and it even trended on social media. Its pilot episode in 2017 got 20.1%, 5.7% higher than rival show Wowowin. The show peaked in its October 10, 2017, episode with a 35.2% nationwide rating, placing it only behind ABS-CBN's TV Patrol and FPJ's Ang Probinsyano that same night as the country's most watched TV broadcast. The same figure also ranked Wildflower as the country's highest-rated TV show on the pre-primetime slot since the Philippines switched to nationwide TV ratings system in 2009.

The show ended in 2018 notching a final nationwide rating of 24.3% in its finale.

Accolades

See also
List of programs broadcast by ABS-CBN
List of ABS-CBN drama series

List of programs broadcast by Jeepney TV

Notes

References

External links
 
 

ABS-CBN drama series
 
Political thriller television series
Philippine crime television series
Philippine action television series
Philippine thriller television series
Espionage television series
Terrorism in television
Television series about revenge
Philippine political television series
2017 Philippine television series debuts
2018 Philippine television series endings
Fiction about rebellions
Mass murder in fiction
Filipino-language television shows
Television shows filmed in the Philippines
Television series about organized crime
Works about organized crime in the Philippines